
Maoping (茅坪 unless otherwise noted) may refer to the following locations in China:

Towns
 Maoping, Qiandongnan Prefecture, in Jinping County, Guizhou
 Maoping, Meitan County, in Meitan County, Guizhou
 Maoping, Hubei, in Zigui County, Hubei
 Maoping, Chengbu County, in Chengbu Miao Autonomous County, Hunan
 Maoping, Baihe County, in Baihe County, Shaanxi
 Maoping, Yang County, in Yang County, Shaanxi
 Maoping Hui Ethnic Town, in Zhen'an County, Shaanxi
 Maoping, Sichuan (毛坪), in Ebian Yi Autonomous County, Sichuan

Townships
 Maoping Township, Hunan, in Longshan County, Hunan
 Maoping Township, Jiangxi, in Jinggangshan, Jiangxi

Villages
 Maoping Village, in Baixi Town, Xinhua County, Loudi City, Hunan
 Maoping Village, in Fengjia Town, Xinhua County, Loudi City, Hunan
 Maoping Village, in Gantian Town, Zhuzhou County, Zhuzhou City, Hunan
 Maoping Village, in Jiangnan Town, Anhua County, Yiyang, Hunan
 Maoping Village, in Jinshi Town, Lianyuan County, Loudi City, Hunan
 Maoping Village, in Liumutang Town, Lianyuan, Loudi City, Hunan
 Maoping Village, in Pingle Township, Yanling County, Hunan
 Maoping Village, in Pingshui Town, Chaling County, Zhuzhou City, Hunan
 Maoping Village, in Pukou Town, Liling City, Zhuzhou City, Hunan
 Maoping Village, in Yatangpu Township, You County, Zhuzhou City, Hunan
 Maoping Village, in Yichongqiao Township, Cili County, Zhangjiajie, Hunan
 Maoping Village, in Yongfeng Town, Shuangfeng County, Loudi City, Hunan
 Maoping Village, in Zhexi Town, Anhua County, Yiyang, Hunan
 Maoping Village, in Zuoshi Township, Xinhua County, Loudi City, Hunan